Bruno Gantillon (born 16 June 1944, in Annemasse), is a French film director and screenwriter.

Filmography

Assistant director

 1970 : Cannabis, directed by Pierre Koralnik

Director
 1970 : Un couple d'artistes
 1971 : Morgane et ses nymphes
 1972 : Le Self-service du nu
 1972 : 
 1976 : Cinéma 16, episode : La maison d'Albert
 1977 : Cinéma 16, episode : L'amuseur
 1977 : Servante et maîtresse (English title: Servant and Mistress)
 1978 : Zigzags
 1979 : Les Héritiers, episode : Les régisseurs
 1979 : Médecins de nuit, 2 episodes : Légitime défense and Léone (TV series)
 1980 : Cinéma 16, episode : L'homme aux chiens
 1981 : Les Héritiers, episode : Les femmes du lac
 1981 : Non lieu
 1983 : Capitaine X
 1985 : Machinations
 1985 : L'Intruse 2
 1987 : Les Mémés sanglantes
 1989 : Le Masque, episode : Les dames du Creusot
 1989–1991 : The Hitchhiker, episodes :
 Living a lie
 Homecoming
 Part of me
 Square deal
 Code Liz
 1989 : Le Dernier Virus
 1991 : Le Triplé gagnant, episode : Fado pour une jeune fille
 1992 : La Scène finale
 1992 : Counterstrike, episodes :
 Bastille day terror
 Til death do us part
 Ripped from the grave
 1993 : Ferbac, episode : Le crime de Ferbac
 1994 : Le Travail du furet
 1994 : Highlander, episode : Warmonger
 1994 : Commissaire Chabert : Mort d'une fugitive
 1995 : Les Derniers Jours de la victime
 1995 : Le Dernier Voyage
 1995 : Dock des anges
 1995 : En danger de vie
 1996 : La Chica
 1996 : La Poupée qui tue
 1997 : En danger de vie
 1998 : Frères et Flics
 2000 : La Passion Schliemann
 2000 : Entre l'arbre et l'écorce
 2001 : Le Marathon du lit
 2001 : Maigret, episode : Mon ami Maigret
 2004–2006 : Léa Parker, episodes :
 Virus
 La Liste noire
 Ondes mortelles
 Hôtel de luxe
 Effet de serre
 2005 : Le Meilleur Commerce du monde
 2005–2006 : Fabien Cosma, episodes :
 Grain de sable
 Syndrome d'imposture
 2005–2007 : Louis la Brocante
 Louis et les Deux Mousquetaires
 Louis et la Chorale
 Louis n'en dort plus
 Louis joue les experts
 2006–2008 : Sous le soleil, episodes :
 Le prix du succès
 Des parents envahissants
 Mariage en danger
 La Révélation
 La Fille de mes rêves
 La Femme aux deux visages
 2008 : Disparitions
 2010 : Le Sang des Atrides (telefilm)
 2011 : Le Tombeau d'Hélios (telefilm)

Screenwriter
 1972 : Sans sommation
 1985 : L'Intruse 2
 1996 : La Chica

Notes and references

External links
 
 

French film directors
French male screenwriters
French screenwriters
1944 births
People from Annemasse
Living people